The 23 August 2008 Swat Valley bombing occurred on 23 August 2008 when a suicide bomber rammed an explosive-laden car into a police station in Charbagh Tehsil of Swat valley of North West Frontier Province killing 20 people. The Tehrik-e-Taleban organisation claimed responsibility.

See also
List of terrorist incidents, 2008
Swat valley#Taliban insurgency and attacks on non-combatants

External links 
 Bomber attacks Pakistani police

2008 murders in Pakistan
21st-century mass murder in Pakistan
Terrorist incidents in Pakistan in 2008
Swat District
Mass murder in 2008
Suicide car and truck bombings in Pakistan
Crime in Khyber Pakhtunkhwa
Attacks on buildings and structures in Pakistan
Attacks on police stations in the 2000s
Building bombings in Pakistan